Presson is a surname. Notable people with the surname include:

Jason Presson (born 1971), American actor
Jay Presson Allen (1922–2006), American screenwriter, playwright, stage director, television producer and novelist
Priscilla Lee Presson (born 1980), American actress, musician, director, writer and producer